Soran-Bushi, B.H. is an album by saxophonist Billy Harper recorded in 1977 and released on the Japanese Denon label.

Reception

AllMusic awarded the album 3 stars.

Track listing
All compositions by Billy Harper.
 "Trying to Get Ready"	- 10:34
 "Loverhood" – 8:40	
 "Soran-Bushi, B.H." – 16:26

Personnel
Billy Harper – tenor saxophone
Everett Hollins – trumpet 
Harold Mabern – piano
Greg Maker – bass
Horacee Arnold, Billy Hart – drums

References 

1978 albums
Billy Harper albums
Denon Records albums